Pieter J.J. van Thiel (1928–2012) was a Dutch art historian known mostly as one of the founders of the Rembrandt Research Project.

From 1964-1991 he was director of the department of paintings at the Rijksmuseum Amsterdam, where he took over from Bob Haak. He wrote the 1976 catalogue "All the Paintings of the Rijksmuseum in Amsterdam" (a supplement was published in 1992), which was finished the same year that The Night Watch was restored. It was during that major restoration project that he was co-author of the first three volumes of the Corpus of Rembrandt paintings. He was a co-founder of the Rembrandt Research Project in 1968, which he left just after retirement in 1993. He was a cataloguer and a major writer of the RRP and contributed to what was published in three volumes as A Corpus of Rembrandt Paintings between 1982 and 1989.

Notable works
 First three catalogues of the Rembrandt Research Project
 All the Paintings of the Rijksmuseum in Amsterdam, 1976 (a supplement was published in 1992)
 Framing in the Golden Age : picture and frame in 17th-century Holland, 1995 
 Rembrandt, de meester en zijn werkplaats, 1991 
 Cornelis Cornelisz. van Haarlem 1562-1638, a monograph and catalogue raisonné, 1999
 100 Hollandse schilderijen = 100 Dutch paintings = 100 tableaux Hollandais = 100 Holländische Gemälde, a selection of 100 top paintings of the Rijksmuseum (1972 tourguide)
 100 Gouden Herinneringen = 100 Golden Memories = 100 Souvenirs d'Or = 100 Goldene Errinerungen, a selection of 100 top paintings of the Rijksmuseum (1992 tourguide)

References 

  van Thiel, Pieter J. J. in the Dictionary of Art Historians
 Dr. P.J.J. van Thiel, former director of paintings in the Rijksmuseum and member of the Rembrandt Research Project passes away, Thursday, 9 August 2012 on codart

1928 births
2012 deaths
Dutch art historians
People from Haarlem